Brossard—La Prairie was a federal electoral district in Quebec, Canada, that was represented in the House of Commons of Canada from 1997 to 2015. As of 2011, its population is 128,001.

Geography

The riding was located in the South Shore area of the Montreal metropolitan region, within the Quebec region of Montérégie.

The district included the Cities of Candiac and La Prairie, the Municipality of Saint-Philippe, and the City of Brossard.

The neighbouring ridings were Châteauguay—Saint-Constant, Beauharnois—Salaberry, Saint-Jean, Chambly—Borduas, Saint-Bruno—Saint-Hubert, and Saint-Lambert. Jeanne-Le Ber and LaSalle—Émard located across the Champlain Bridge.

History

The riding was created in 1996 from parts of La Prairie riding.

It consisted initially of the cities of Brossard, Candiac and La Prairie, and the Parish Municipality of Saint-Philippe in the County Regional Municipality of Roussillon.

It was dissolved into the new ridings of La Prairie and Brossard—Saint-Lambert for the 2015 election.

Members of Parliament

This riding has elected the following Members of Parliament:

Election results

|-

|align="left" colspan=2|Liberal gain from Bloc Québécois
|align="right"|Swing
|align="right"| -1.1
|align="right"|

1 Alexandra Mendes of the Liberal party won the riding seat on 24 October 2008 following a judicial recount. Previously, the Returning Officer for the riding validated the vote counts as 19,202 to 19,100 in favour of Marcel Lussier of the Bloc Québécois.

	

	
Note: Conservative vote is compared to the total of the Canadian Alliance vote and Progressive Conservative vote in 2000 election.

See also
 List of Canadian federal electoral districts
 Past Canadian electoral districts

References

Campaign expense data from Elections Canada
Riding history from the Library of Parliament

Notes

External links
 Brossard—La Prairie riding profile at CBC News

Former federal electoral districts of Quebec
La Prairie, Quebec
Politics of Brossard